European Western Balkans (sometimes abbreviated EWB) is a web portal that focuses on the Western Balkans countries and reports on development of the European Union's enlargement policy towards the states of North Macedonia, Montenegro, Serbia, Albania, Bosnia and Herzegovina and Kosovo.

The objective of European Western Balkans is to enhance understanding, raise awareness and further dialogue surrounding issues facing the democratization of Balkan nations and the desire for its integration in the European Union. The European Western Balkans website takes a more journalistic than scholarly approach with interviews and analysis from journalists, experts, analysts, writers, historians, as well as leaders and political figures from the European Union and Western Balkan states. 

European Western Balkans is entirely independent and it is owned and run by the Centre for Contemporary Politics think tank based in Belgrade. In 2016 the portal, along with its parent organization and Konrad Adenauer Foundation, published a guide in Serbian "Evropski parlament i Srbija" (European Parliament and Serbia) with the aim of helping Serbian MP's understand how European Parliament works. The promotion of the guide took place in National Assembly of Serbia and the speakers were David McAlister and Maja Gojković.

Content 

Besides publishing regular news, EWB has a series of interviews with key people from Western Balkans countries which are involved in European integration process of their countries and interviews with politicians and specialists in a wide range of fields especially in European Politics and European integration.

In August 2020, EWB started recording weekly show called "EWB Screening" on their YouTube and Facebook account. The format of the show consists of one-on-one half an hour interviews with various experts on the topic of European integration related subjects primarily of Serbia, but also of the entire Western Balkans region.

EWB Award for the Contribution to the European Integration

EWB gives out an annual award for the "Contribution to the European Integration" to persons who have contributed the most to the EU integration of the Western Balkans region. The first award was awarded in 2019 to Nikola Dimitrov, Minister of Foreign Affairs of North Macedonia. In 2020, EWB awarded Tanja Fajon, Member of the European Parliament, for "her unwavering commitment to the European future of the Western Balkans amidst rising challenges, continued representation of the value-based EU in the region, as well as the principled promotion of democracy, freedom and tolerance".

European Western Balkans - Srbija

In April 2017, European Western Balkans - Srbija started to work. New web portal, in Serbian, is focused mainly on European integration of Republic of Serbia, following negotiations of chapters of Community acquis.

Balkanoscope
On 26 March 2018 a new project called "Balkanoscope" was presented in Brussels. It is a joint initiative of EWB and European Fund for the Balkans. The aim of the project is to "present the Balkans from a different viewpoint...where real people are struggling with real issues" by publishing different stories and interviews.

As of 7 August 2018 there are English and French version of the portal.

Notes

References

External links
 Facebook: European Western Balkans
 Balkanoscope

Internet properties established in 2014
2014 establishments in Europe
Publications established in 2014
Balkans